Maulana Mohammad Amin was a Persian statesman in Safavid Iran, who served as the munshi al-mamalik ("state scribe") and was the head of the insha al-mamalik ("imperial correspondence") under Shah Abbas I from 1588 till his death in 1591/2. He was the grandson of Maulana Adham, who was a prominent chancellery official during the late reign of Ismail I, and the early reign of the latter’s successor Tahmasp I.

Sources 
 

16th-century Iranian politicians
1591 deaths
16th-century births
Safavid civil servants
16th-century people of Safavid Iran